Mohamed Aziz Dougaz (born 26 March 1997) is a Tunisian tennis player.

Dougaz has a career high ATP singles ranking of 269 achieved on 6 March 2023. He also has a career high ATP doubles ranking of 261 achieved on 2 December 2019.

On the junior tour Dougaz had a career high ranking of 46 achieved on 16 February 2015. Dougaz reached the quarterfinals of the 2015 Wimbledon Championships boys' doubles event.

Dougaz has represented Tunisia in the Davis Cup, where he has a win-loss record of 12–7.

Challenger and Futures finals

Singles: 17 (11–6)

Doubles 35 (21–14)

Davis Cup

Participations: (12–7)

   indicates the outcome of the Davis Cup match followed by the score, date, place of event, the zonal classification and its phase, and the court surface.

Another finals

Mediterranean Games

Doubles 1 (1 runner-up)

African Games

Doubles 1 (1 victory)

External links

Florida State University bio

1997 births
Living people
Tunisian male tennis players
People from La Marsa
Florida State Seminoles men's tennis players
Sportspeople from Tallahassee, Florida
Mediterranean Games silver medalists for Tunisia
Mediterranean Games medalists in tennis
Competitors at the 2018 Mediterranean Games
Competitors at the 2019 African Games
African Games gold medalists for Tunisia
African Games medalists in tennis
21st-century Tunisian people